Owatonna Degner Regional Airport  is three miles northwest of Owatonna, in Steele County, Minnesota. Its IATA identifier "OWA" comes from the first three letters of the city of Owatonna. The airport is used for general aviation.

History
Airport construction started in 1946. It was completed and the airport opened in 1947 with four unpaved runways. In 1987 the City Council of Owatonna renamed the airport Glenn J. Degner Airfield, after one of the original aviation pioneers of Owatonna. The airport was renamed The Owatonna Degner Regional Airport in August 1999.

Accidents
East Coast Jets Flight 81 was a business jet flight operated by East Coast Jets and destined for Owatonna. The plane crashed on July 31, 2008, while attempting a go-around at the airport, killing all eight passengers and crew on board.

References

External links

 Owatonna Degner Regional Airport
 Minnesota Public Airports (OWA) at Minnesota Department of Transportation Airport Directory
 Aerial image as of 2019 from Google Maps
 
 

Airports in Minnesota
Transportation in Steele County, Minnesota
Buildings and structures in Steele County, Minnesota